KGEN (1370 AM) is a radio station broadcasting a Regional Mexican format. Licensed to Tulare, California, United States, the station is currently owned by Jose Arredondo, through licensee JA Ventures, Inc.

History
The station had fallen into bankruptcy in the mid-1960s before being acquired by Harry J. Pappas and his brothers Pete and Mike.

References

External links

GEN (AM)
Regional Mexican radio stations in the United States
GEN (AM)